Darryl Haley (born February 16, 1961) is a former professional American football offensive lineman in the National Football League (NFL). He played six seasons for the New England Patriots, the Cleveland Browns, and the Green Bay Packers.

External links
Patriots player page

1961 births
Living people
People from Gardena, California
Players of American football from California
Sportspeople from Los Angeles County, California
American football offensive tackles
Utah Utes football players
New England Patriots players
Cleveland Browns players
Green Bay Packers players